Depends What You Mean By Extremist: Going Rogue with Australian Deplorables is a 2017 book written by Australian author and documentary-maker John Safran. Safran investigates Australian extremists and radicalisation, including among white nationalists, ISIS supporters and anarchists.

See also
 Far-right politics in Australia
Far-right terrorism in Australia

References

2017 non-fiction books
Australian non-fiction books
Islamophobia in Australia
White nationalism in Australia
Hamish Hamilton books